Minnesota North College – Itasca, formerly Itasca Community College (ICC), is a public community college campus in Grand Rapids, Minnesota. It was founded in 1922 and accredited by the Higher Learning Commission.

In 2022, the board of trustees of the Minnesota State Colleges and Universities merged the college with several others into a single institution called Minnesota North College.

Academics
Enrollment for the 2017–2019 school year was about 1400 students and the college had 40 full-time faculty members. This location offers diplomas, associate degrees, and professional certificates.

Athletics
As part of Minnesota North College, a member of the Minnesota College Athletic Conference (MCAC) National Junior College Athletic Association (NJCAA), Viking Athletics include baseball, softball, football, men's basketball, women's basketball, volleyball, trap league, and wrestling.  In 2000, men's basketball replaced men's ice hockey as a varsity sport. Teams competed in the Minnesota Community College Conference.  At the NJCAA National Wrestling Championship held in Rochester, Minnesota on February 22–24, 2007, heavyweight Chris Miller became the campus' first national champion.

Notable alumni
John T. Davies - Minnesota jurist and legislator
Brock Larson - wrestler; retired mixed martial artist
George Gilbert Wangensteen - Minnesota lawyer and legislator

References

External links
 

Two-year colleges in the United States
Educational institutions established in 1922
Education in Itasca County, Minnesota
Buildings and structures in Itasca County, Minnesota
Community colleges in Minnesota
NJCAA athletics
Minnesota North College
Grand Rapids, Minnesota
1922 establishments in Minnesota